Sematan Airport  is located in Sematan, Lundu District, Sarawak, Malaysia. There are no scheduled flights at this airport.

See also

 List of airports in Malaysia

References

External links
 

Airports in Sarawak
Lundu District